The XY Company also known as the New North West Company was a joint-stock fur trading enterprise  based in Montreal that conducted business chiefly in the Canadian Northwest between 1798 and 1804.  It was established in opposition to the North West Company, whose employees called it the Little Company and the Potties.

Background
In 1795 some partners withdrew from the North West Company and began to trade on their own through the firm of Forsyth, Richardson & Company which already was engaged in the trade around Lake Superior. Due to the animosity that arose between Simon McTavish and Alexander McKenzie this agreement was superseded in 1798 when new partners were admitted and others retired.

Foundation
After the Jay Treaty of 1794, Britain evacuated its military posts at Michilimackinac and Detroit which meant that Canadian firms operating on United States territory had to leave, either to dissolved or to compete with the North West Company north of the international border, west of Lake Superior. The XY Company was founded in 1798 when the Forsyth, Richardson & Company (which was a subsidiary of the London firm of Phyn, Ellis & Company) and Leith, Jamieson & Company of Detroit united in order to increase its competitive advantage against the North West Company. It was invigorated when John Ogilvy and John Mure entered the company in 1800 and Alexander Mackenzie joined in 1802.

Operations

From its beginning, the XY Company contested the North West Company dominance in the Canadian Northwest. Its robust financial support made it possible to open competing fur trading posts on the Red River, at Rainy Lake and Bas de la Rivière Winnipic and many other sites in close vicinity to already existing North West Company posts.

In 1801 the XY Company had posts on the Saskatchewan, in 1803 on the Great Bear Lake, and the same year posts were established on the Peace and the Swan rivers. When the North West Company in 1802 moved its rendezvous from Grand Portage to  Kaministiquia, the XY Company followed in 1804. The company then also had a trading fort at Qu'Appelle River and a winter post at Fishing Lake. The XY Company also had a post at Fort Charlotte, by the Pigeon River at the upper end of the portage from Lake Superior.  In the North-Western Territory, the XY Company built posts in the immediate vicinity of those of the North West Company; depots near Fort Chipewyan, the posts at the Great Slave Lake, Fort Liard on the Mackenzie River, and at Great Bear Lake. In the Peace River are the XY Company estqablished four posts. It also had depots at Île-à-la-Crosse and Green Lake.

The rivalry between North West Company and XY Company led to an increased use of hard liquor as a competitive means. North West Company increased its use of rum and other spirits from 10,000 gallons in 1799 to 16,000 in 1803. North West Company's average use of hard liquor 1802-1804 was 14,400 gallons, while the average for the XY Company during the same period was 5,000 gallons. Soon both companies were losing money, important fur trading areas became depleted and relations with the First Nations were impaired.

The often close proximity of North West Company's and XY Company's post led to violent interactions between clerks and servants of the companies. In August 1802, a clerk of the XY Company shot and killed a clerk of the North West Company after the latter attempted to steal his furs. The killer was indicted for murder in Montreal, but he was set free as the court had doubt about its jurisdiction; the act having taken place at Fort de l'Isle on the North Saskatchewan River.

Merger
In 1803, Alexander Mackenzie reorganized the company as a partnership under the name Sir Alexander Mackenzie & Company, but it was nevertheless mostly called the XY Company. The vehement contest with the North West Company for market shares caused instability in the fur-producing regions and decreased revenue for both companies. In order to end the competition, thereby increasing profit, the two companies merged in 1804 with the North West Company absorbing the XY Company. The XY Company becoming a part owner receiving 25 of the reconstructed North West Company's 100 shares. Yet, McTavish, Frobisher & Company continued as the only agent of the North West Company, and Alexander McKenzie was barred from any engagement in the fur trade. Increased profitability after the merger was reached, among other measures, by lowering the salaries of the clerks.

References

Citations

Cited literature
 Brophy, Susan Dianne (2022). A Legacy of Exploitation: Early Capitalism in the Red River Colony, 1763–1821. The University of British Columbia.
 Davidson, Gordon Charles (1918). The North West Company. New York.
 Easterbrook, William Thomas & Aitken, Hugh G. J. (1988). Canadian Economic History. University of Toronto Press.
 Innis, Harold A. (1930). The Fur Trade in Canada. Yale University Press.
 National Park Service (2001). Grand Portage National Monument, Minnesota: Draft General Management Plan. United States Department of the Interior.
 Yerbury, John Colin (1986). The Subarctic Indians and the Fur Trade, 1680-1860. University of British Columbia Press.

 
Fur trade
Trading companies of Canada
1798 establishments in Lower Canada
1804 disestablishments in Lower Canada
Companies disestablished in 1804
Companies based in Montreal
Defunct companies of Quebec
Economic history of Canada
British North America
Companies established in 1798
Trading companies established in the 18th century
Trading companies disestablished in the 19th century